Cub Creek is a stream in Iron and Washington counties in the U.S. state of Missouri. It is a tributary of Courtois Creek.

The stream source area is in northern Iron County adjacent to the intersection of routes 32 and DD. The stream flows north to northwest into Washington County past Quaker. It then flows west parallel to route C to its confluence with Courtois Creek north of Courtois. The stream lies within the Mark Twain National Forest.

Cub Creek received its name on account of bears in the area.

See also
List of rivers of Missouri

References

Rivers of Iron County, Missouri
Rivers of Washington County, Missouri
Rivers of Missouri